Ambrosia fungi are fungal symbionts of ambrosia beetles including the polyphagous and Kuroshio shot hole borers.

There are a few dozen species described ambrosia fungi, currently placed in polyphyletic genera Ambrosiella, Rafaellea and Dryadomyces (all from Ophiostomatales, Ascomycota). Probably many more species remain to be discovered. Little is known about ecology of ambrosia fungi, as well as about their specificity to ambrosia beetle species. Ambrosia fungi are thought to be dependent on transport and inoculation provided by their beetle symbionts, as they have not been found in any other habitat. All ambrosia fungi are probably asexual and clonal.

References

Ophiostomatales